Darko Martinović (born September 18, 1982 in Mostar) is a Bosnian-Herzegovinian professional handballer, playing as right back.

References 

http://www.eurohandball.com/ec/cwc/men/2007-08/player/521074/Darko+Martinovic

External links
Facebook page

1982 births
Living people
Bosnia and Herzegovina male handball players
Croats of Bosnia and Herzegovina
Sportspeople from Mostar
Liga ASOBAL players
IFK Kristianstad players